Lan Bale and Stephen Noteboom were the defending champions, but did not participate this year.

Pablo Albano and Àlex Corretja won the title, defeating Karsten Braasch and Jens Knippschild 3–6, 7–5, 6–2 in the final.

Seeds

  Ellis Ferreira /  Patrick Galbraith (first round)
  Hendrik Jan Davids /  Menno Oosting (quarterfinals)
  Joshua Eagle /  Andrew Florent (first round)
  David Adams /  Fernon Wibier (quarterfinals)

Draw

Draw

External links
Draw

1997 BMW Open